The New Freewoman was a monthly London literary magazine edited by Dora Marsden and owned by Harriet Shaw Weaver. Initially, Rebecca West was in charge of the literary content of the magazine, but after meeting Ezra Pound at one of Violet Hunt's parties in 1913 she recommended that he be appointed literary editor. The magazine existed between June 1913 and December 1913.

References

 Julian Symons, Makers of the New: The Revolution in Literature, 1912–1939, Andre Deutsch, 1987,

Articles download
 https://web.archive.org/web/20061114150101/http://www.nonserviam.com/egoistarchive/marsden/TheNewFreewoman/index.html
 http://tmh.floonet.net/pdf/newfreewomanindex.pdf

External links
The New Freewoman at the Modernist Journals Project: a cover-to-cover, searchable digital edition of all 13 issues, from No. 1.1 (June 15, 1913) through No. 1.13 (December 15, 1913). PDFs of these issues may be downloaded for free from the MJP website.

1913 establishments in the United Kingdom
1913 disestablishments in the United Kingdom
Monthly magazines published in the United Kingdom
Defunct literary magazines published in the United Kingdom
Magazines established in 1913
Magazines disestablished in 1913
Magazines published in London